Seyyed Hossein Makki was an Iranian politician, orator and historian. He was a member of Parliament of Iran for three consecutive terms from 1947 to 1953.

The son of a bazaari merchant, Makki was an employee of National Iranian Railroad Company, having previously served as a non-commissioned officer in the Imperial Iranian Air Force. 
He began his career as a journalist in 1941 and was a founding member of the Iran Party, as one of the few who was not Western-educated. He left the party as a leading member of Democrat Party of Iran in 1946 and entered the Parliament of Iran as a protégé of Ahmad Qavam in 1947. He left his patron in 1949 to embrace a nationalist cause, befriending Mohammad Mossadegh and co-founding National Front. He actively supported nationalization of the Iran oil industry movement and delivered a filibustering speech that took four days to prevent the oil agreement. He later broke away from Mossadegh and the National Front.

He was briefly imprisoned in 1955 and spent the rest of his life writing about Iranian history, most notably the best-selling eight-volume series Tāriḵ-e bist sāla-ye Irān (Twenty Year History of Iran).

References 

1911 births
1999 deaths
People from Yazd Province
Iran Party politicians
Democrat Party of Iran politicians
National Front (Iran) MPs
Deputies of Tehran, Rey, Shemiranat and Eslamshahr
20th-century Iranian historians
Imperial Iranian Air Force personnel
Iranian politicians who have crossed the floor
Members of the 15th Iranian Majlis
Members of the 16th Iranian Majlis
Members of the 17th Iranian Majlis